Herina rivosecchii is a species of picture-winged fly in the genus Herina of the family Ulidiidae found in Croatia, France, Greece, Italy, Switzerland, and Spain.

References

Ulidiidae
Insects described in 2002
Diptera of Europe